Lucy Saroyan (January 17, 1946 – April 11, 2003) was an American actress and photographer.

Life and career
Saroyan was born in San Francisco, California, the daughter of the writer William Saroyan and the actress Carol Grace. Her brother is writer Aram Saroyan. Lucy attended the Dalton School in New York, her mother's alma mater, where Carol solidified her lifelong friendships with Gloria Vanderbilt and Oona O'Neill. She spent her adolescent summers at a horse camp in Montana. Following her parents' second divorce, her mother married the actor Walter Matthau and Lucy later worked alongside her stepfather in a number of his films. She also played small parts on Broadway, off-Broadway, and on TV, in addition to working as a film library archivist. Her most notable film role was in Paul Schrader's 1978 film Blue Collar, in which she played Harvey Keitel's wife.  She dated comic legend and Blue Collar co-star Richard Pryor during this time.

The first exhibit of Lucy Saroyan's posthumously discovered portraits of A-List Hollywood and New York entertainment figures of the 1970s and 1980s opened at the Craig Krull Gallery in Santa Monica on January 16, 2010. Her portrait of Dennis Hopper was included in the 2009 retrospective exhibit of Hopper's own photography in Paris and Australia.

Death and legacy
She died in Thousand Oaks, California, on April 11, 2003, at the age of 57 from cirrhosis of the liver caused by hepatitis C. Her mother died three months later. 

Lucy Saroyan's personal papers, including dozens of letters and postcards to and from her father from early childhood until their eventual estrangement, are archived in the Fresno County Public Library. The collection also comprises hundreds of personal snapshots of Lucy and her entertainment industry friends and acquaintances, and contact sheets from Lucy's early professional modeling sessions. Among the latter are portraits of Lucy and her brother Aram as children, and of Lucy as a young woman by Richard Avedon.

Filmography
The Grass Roots "Bella Linda Video"(1967)
Isadora (1968) - (uncredited)
Some Kind of a Nut (1969) - Samantha
Cactus Flower (1969) - Dancer (uncredited)
Maidstone (1970)
Kotch (1971) - Sissy
The Taking of Pelham One Two Three (1974) - Coed #2 (Hostage)
Columbo: Old Fashioned Murder (1976, TV) - Elise
American Raspberry (1977) - Connie
Greased Lightning (1977) - Hutch's Wife
Blue Collar (1978) - Arlene Bartowski
Hopscotch (1980) - Carla (final film role)

References

External links

1946 births
2003 deaths
20th-century American actresses
Actresses from San Francisco
American film actresses
American people of Armenian descent
American people of Russian-Jewish descent
Jewish American actresses
Deaths from cirrhosis
Saroyan family
Photographers from San Francisco
20th-century American Jews
21st-century American Jews
21st-century American women